The Ernest N. Morial Convention Center is located in Downtown New Orleans, Louisiana, United States.  The lower end of building one is located  upriver from Canal Street on the banks of the Mississippi River. It is named after former Mayor of New Orleans Ernest Nathan Morial.

It has about 1.1 million sq. ft. (102,000 m2) of exhibit space, covering almost 11 blocks, and over 3 million sq. ft. (280,000 m2) of total space. The front of the main building is 1 kilometer long.

History
The center was planned starting in 1978. It is the fifth-largest facility of its kind in the United States, and as of early 2005 was the second-busiest.  The first portion of the building was constructed as part of the 1984 Louisiana World Exposition; a series of additions in subsequent decades expanded the center further upriver.  The complex was named in honor of Ernest N. Morial, the city's first African American mayor, in 1992.  In 2008, the center was renamed the New Orleans Morial Convention Center in order to emphasize its New Orleans location.

From August 26 through 27, 2005, Wheel of Fortune came to tape three weeks of shows at the convention center. But as Hurricane Katrina threatened the area, they canceled the last week in order to evacuate. In the aftermath of Katrina, the Convention Center was the second most important shelter for survivors, after the Louisiana Superdome.  After serving as a temporary medical clinic for some time, the structure again began welcoming conventions in early 2006, including that of the American Library Association.

Hurricane Katrina 

After Hurricane Katrina passed through the city in 2005, thousands of evacuees were directed to the Convention Center as an unofficial evacuation center.  In the confusion following the disaster, people escaping from flooded neighborhoods were directed to the Convention Center by police and word of mouth, with the expectation that there would be provisions, aid, and evacuation buses there. However no such resources were there for several days.

Around 20,000–25,000 people gathered at the complex in difficult conditions with no power, no water, no food, no medical supplies, no proper sanitation, and with only minimal occasional law enforcement presence within the center, resulting in incidents of crime and gang violence. There were reports of multiple deaths at the center, from causes including violence, dehydration, and lack of medication for the ill.

The poor conditions and lack of prompt government response at the convention center were revealed to the nation on several TV news networks including CNN and Fox. Secretary of Homeland Security Michael Chertoff falsely claimed to be unaware of any problem with conditions even after the networks had been broadcasting images and live reports from the Convention Center. The Morial Convention Center was declared evacuated on September 4.

Post-Katrina 
The Convention Center finished a complete renovation of the facility in November 2006.  A previously scheduled expansion project, which would add  of exhibition space in a new building, has been temporarily delayed. The 2006 renovations included the creation of the 4,032-seat New Orleans Theater, a concert hall used primarily for concerts, Broadway stage shows, and other special events.

Hosting events (and sports events)
The 2014 NBA All-Star Game Jam Session, NBA All-Star Celebrity Game and NBA All-Star practice, were held at the convention center.
PFL 8, a mixed martial arts event was held at the convention center on October 5, 2018.
The 71st Miss Universe competition held on January 14, 2023.

See also
List of convention centers in the United States

References

External links 

 Convention Center website

Convention centers in Louisiana
Basketball venues in New Orleans
Mixed martial arts venues in Louisiana
Buildings and structures in New Orleans
Event venues established in 1984
Tourist attractions in New Orleans
World's fair architecture in the United States
1984 establishments in Louisiana
1984 Louisiana World Exposition